The Sheila Divine is an American, Boston-based rock group. Critics compare their sound to the band's own heroes, mainly the early 1980s post-punk. The band is most often noted for its loud/soft musical dynamic and Aaron Perrino's soaring vocals, screaming in key one moment and howling a falsetto the next. The band has a large die hard fan base in what is often called "the three Bs": Boston, Buffalo, and Belgium.

The band most often explains that they take the name from the Australian term "sheila," which denotes an effeminate man or wimp – thus making them in a literal sense, the sacred wimps. However, there is also, in fact, a real live woman named Sheila Devine, who Aaron, Jim, and Shawn were friends with at Oneonta State University.

Overview 

The Sheila Divine formed in 1997 and played their first show on July 4 at The Middle East in Cambridge, Massachusetts. The lineup consisted of singer, songwriter, guitarist Aaron Perrino, bassist Jim Gilbert, and drummer Shawn Sears. All three had met in college at State University of New York at Oneonta, but each had ended up in Boston independently. They were signed to local indie label CherryDisc Records and released their self-titled five-track EP in 1998. They gained a loyal local following and went on to win the 1999 WBCN Rock & Roll Rumble. CherryDisc Records were bought out by Roadrunner Records, who released The Sheila Divine's  first full-length album New Parade in 1999. It received critical praise from local press and spawned the college radio hit Hum. The album featured re-recorded versions of songs that appeared on their first EP, as well as several brand new songs (the Japanese import edition featured two additional songs unavailable on the domestic release, "Secret Rendezvous" and "Weightless," the latter of which had also been released as the b-side to the then-titled "Criminal," the band's only released vinyl 7-inch). By the end of 1999 New Parade received very positive comments in the major press in Belgium, e.g. Knack (magazine). The single Like a criminal reached the radio chart De Afrekening and was included on the compilation album De Afrekening 21.

In late 2000, the band was hard at work on their second album when they added Colin Decker as a second guitarist to broaden their sound. The band released their second album, Where Have My Countrymen Gone, in March 2001 on Co-Op Pop Records. Later that year, in August, Shawn Sears left the band to spend more time with his recently born child. Following a handful of shows with fill-ins Pete Caldes (The Gravel Pit/The Gentlemen) and Paul Buckley (Orbit), drummer Ryan Dolan replaced Sears a month later; Dolan had previously been in the band Lincolnville with guitarist Colin Decker. The Sheila Divine continued to tour constantly and created a large fan base that included both people who would see them across the country and others who would record live shows to share. The band was always generous to bootleggers and allowed video and/or audio taping at all shows.

The band released the six-track EP Secret Society in September 2002 (Arena Rock Recording Co.). They embarked on a non-stop world tour of China, Europe, and then across the United States and back. This rigorous schedule would prove to be the band's undoing. While at a show in Milwaukee, a confrontation with Jim resulted in Aaron throwing his guitar down and announcing that the band was breaking up. Upon returning home, the band stated they would not break up on their website but would instead take time off. Aaron Perrino went on to start recording songs in the studio by himself, which would end up on the War Chords EP, the debut release of his new solo project, Dear Leader. The Sheila Divine officially announced their demise on their website in April 2003 and played two farewell shows in October at The Paradise in Boston, Massachusetts.  The sold-out shows were attended by fans who had traveled from as far away as Belgium. The 2nd show was subsequently released as a DVD in 2007 entitled Funeral.

On December 31, 2005, The Sheila Divine played a reunion show at Bill's Bar on Landsdowne Street in Boston. The band played as a three-piece with Aaron, Jim, and Ryan. A second reunion show was played on Saint Patrick's Day March 17, 2007, at T.T. the Bear's Place with the same lineup.  Subsequent reunion shows with Aaron, Jim, and Shawn's original line-up took place on December 27, 2007, at TT the Bear's Place in Cambridge, MA, and the following two nights (both sold-out shows) at the Paradise Rock Club in Boston, MA.
They played another short reunion show in Antwerp, Belgium at Humo's Pop Poll Deluxe at the Sportpaleis on March 3, 2008.

On September 4, 2010, they played at Crammerock (Stekene, Belgium) another reunion show, with special guest Stijn Meuris who sang along on 'Automatic Buffalo.'

The Sheila Divine performed a show on January 14, 2011, at the Paradise Rock Club in Boston, MA, with Orbit.  They also played at the Paradise Rock Club in Boston, MA on February 4, 2012, with Hurricane Bells and The Field Effect.

Reunion 
In October 2010, The Sheila Divine regrouped and recorded a new album titled The Things That Once Were. The studio recordings were broadcast to the world via UStream, allowing an interactive experience between the band, studio crew, and fans.

The 2019 album Beginning of The End is Where We'll Start Again again received a rather positive press in Belgium, resulting in a tour through Belgium and the Netherlands.

Discography

Albums 
 New Parade (1999 · Roadrunner Records)
 Where Have My Countrymen Gone (2001 · Co-Op Pop Records)
 The Things That Once Were (2012 · Independent)
 The Morbs (2015 · Independent)
 Beginning of The End is Where We'll Start Again (2019 · Independent)

EPs 
 The Sheila Divine EP (1998 · CherryDisc Records)
 Secret Society EP (2002 · Arena Rock Recording Co.)
 Fossils From The Fire (2015 · Independent)

Singles 
 "Like A Criminal" 7" vinyl (1998 · CherryDisc Records)
 "Hum" radio promo CD (1999 · Roadrunner Records)
 "Hum" / "I'm A Believer" cassette promo (1999 · Roadrunner Records)
 "Ostrich" radio promo CD (2001 · Independent)
 "Shakespeare Underground" (2015 · Independent)
 "Watch Out For Us" (2015 · Independent)
 "Time To Set It Off" (2018 · Independent)
 "Melancholy, MA" (2018 · Independent)
 "Age Is Just a Number" (2019 · Independent)

Video 
 Funeral live DVD (2007 · Independent)

Compilations 
 Viva Noel – A Q Division Christmas : "O Holy Night" (1999 · Q Division Records)
 Then Covered Now : "Metal Health (Bang Your Head)" (1999 · Hearbox Records)
 In Our Lifetime: Vol. 3 : "New Landscape" (2002 · Fenway Recordings)

Timeline

References

Further reading

External links 
 
The Sheila Divine Archive
The Sheila Divine on bandcamp.com

Musical groups from Boston
American post-punk music groups
Arena Rock Recording Company artists
Indie rock musical groups from Massachusetts